The cabinet secretary of Pakistan is the federal secretary to the Cabinet of Pakistan. The Cabinet secretary serves as the administrative head of the Cabinet Division, providing policy advice to the prime minister and Cabinet. Usually the senior-most BPS-22 grade officer of the Pakistan Administrative Service is appointed to this post.

Officeholders being the senior-most civil servants of the country head the secretaries’ committee and have direct say in the transfers, postings and promotions of elite civil servants in BPS 20, BPS 21 and BPS 22. During meetings of the federal cabinet, the Cabinet secretary sits on the right-hand side of the Prime Minister.

See also
Government of Pakistan
Establishment Secretary of Pakistan
Interior Secretary of Pakistan
Finance Secretary of Pakistan
Federal Secretary National Security Division

References

Federal government ministries of Pakistan